Michael Lee (born October 5, 1990) is an American former professional ice hockey goaltender who most notably split time between the Portland Pirates of the American Hockey League (AHL) and the Gwinnett Gladiators of the ECHL as a prospect in the National Hockey League's Arizona Coyotes system.  He was drafted in the third round (91st overall) by the Phoenix Coyotes in the 2009 NHL Entry Draft. Lee was born in Fargo, North Dakota, but grew up in Roseau, Minnesota. He is currently an Assistant Coach at St Cloud State.

Playing career
Prior to attending St. Cloud State, Lee was the goaltender for the Fargo Force of the USHL in 2008-9.  Despite being an expansion team, Lee led the Force to the USHL playoff finals.  As a high school goaltender, Lee helped the Roseau Rams to the Minnesota state hockey championship.

Lee was the first American goalie selected in the 2009 draft. He also played on the gold-medal winning USA team at the 2010 IIHF World Juniors.  Lee started for Team USA in the gold medal game, but was relieved by Jack Campbell in the second period. When the Coyotes traded away backup goalie Devan Dubnyk, Lee was called up to be Mike Smith's new backup, putting Lee in the NHL for the first time. However, he was sent down in favor of Mike McKenna before entering a game.

Awards and honors

References

External links

1990 births
Living people
American men's ice hockey goaltenders
Arizona Coyotes draft picks
Fargo Force players
Gwinnett Gladiators players
Ice hockey players from Minnesota
Ice hockey people from North Dakota
Sportspeople from Fargo, North Dakota
People from Roseau County, Minnesota
Portland Pirates players
St. Cloud State Huskies men's ice hockey players